

Wolf-Dietrich von Xylander (9 April 1903 – 15 February 1945) was a German general during World War II. He was a recipient of the Knight's Cross of the Iron Cross of Nazi Germany. Xylander was killed on 15 February 1945 in an airplane crash near Struppen, Germany. He was posthumously awarded the Knight's Cross on 20 February 1945.

Awards and decorations

 Knight's Cross of the Iron Cross on 20 February 1945 as Generalleutnant and Chief of the Generalstab of HeeresGruppe Mitte

References

Citations

Bibliography

 

1903 births
1945 deaths
Military personnel from Munich
Lieutenant generals of the German Army (Wehrmacht)
Imperial Knights
People from the Kingdom of Bavaria
Recipients of the Gold German Cross
Recipients of the Knight's Cross of the Iron Cross
Victims of aviation accidents or incidents in Germany
Victims of aviation accidents or incidents in 1945
German Army generals of World War II